M. Ramappa (8 July 1922 – 25 July 1991) was an Indian politician and leader of Communist Party of India. He represented Manjeshwar constituency in 5th Kerala Legislative Assembly.

References

Communist Party of India politicians from Kerala
1922 births
1991 deaths
Kerala MLAs 1970–1977
Kerala MLAs 1977–1979